Magomed Magomedov (born 31 August 1991) is a Russian judoka.

He is the silver medallist of the 2017 Judo Grand Prix The Hague in the -90 kg category.

References

External links
 

1991 births
Living people
Russian male judoka
Russian sambo practitioners
20th-century Russian people
21st-century Russian people